The Texas State Bobcats college football team represents Texas State University as a member of the Sun Belt Conference. The Bobcats competes as part of the NCAA Division I Football Bowl Subdivision. The program has had 20 head coaches, and one interim head coach, since it began play during the 1904 season. Since December 2022, G. J. Kinne has served as head coach at Texas State.

Key

Coaches

Notes

References

Texas State Bobcats
Texas State Bobcats football coaches